Kyōichi, Kyoichi or Kyouichi (written: , ,  or ) is a masculine Japanese given name. Notable people with the name include:

, Japanese aikidoka
, Japanese writer
, Japanese academic
, Japanese whale watcher
, Japanese photographer
, Japanese historian

Japanese masculine given names